Jorge Raúl Zules Caicedo (born 14 February 1991) is a Colombian professional footballer who plays as a centre-back for Independiente Rivadavia.

Career
Zules Caicedo arrived in Argentina from Colombia in 2012, signing with Douglas Haig of Primera B Nacional despite not being attached to a club back in his homeland. He remained for two years but made just one appearance. 2014 saw the defender move down to Torneo Federal B with Sport Club Salto. He netted one goal across four fixtures as they finished bottom in Zona 6. Having spent six months with them, Zules Caicedo left to join Torneo Federal A side Defensores de Belgrano. His first goal came in a 2–0 victory over Unión Sunchales on 2 August 2015, it was his sole goal in seventy-nine games for the Ramallo club.

In June 2018, Independiente Rivadavia of Primera B Nacional completed the signing of Zules Caicedo. He made his professional debut on 25 August against Los Andes, with his new team winning 0–1 at the Estadio Eduardo Gallardón. After seventeen total appearances as they reached the promotion play-offs, Zules Caicedo switched Independiente for newly-promoted Primera B Nacional outfit Alvarado on 18 July 2019. Six months later, Zules Caicedo sealed a move to Primera División side Unión Santa Fe. He terminated his contract on 3 February 2021, having not featured competitively; he made the bench twelve times.

Immediately after leaving Unión, Zules Caicedo made a return to Primera B Nacional with San Martín. In December 2021, he signed with Independiente Rivadavia for the 2022 season.

Career statistics
.

References

External links

1991 births
Living people
People from Putumayo Department
Colombian footballers
Association football defenders
Colombian expatriate footballers
Expatriate footballers in Argentina
Colombian expatriate sportspeople in Argentina
Primera Nacional players
Torneo Federal A players
Club Atlético Douglas Haig players
Defensores de Belgrano de Villa Ramallo players
Independiente Rivadavia footballers
Club Atlético Alvarado players
Unión de Santa Fe footballers
San Martín de San Juan footballers